Echinscus azoricus is a species of tardigrade in the family Echiniscidae.  The species is endemic to the Azores Islands. The species was first described by Paulo Fontoura, Giovanni Pilato and Oscar Lisi in 2008.

References

azoricus
Endemic fauna of the Azores
Invertebrates of the Azores
Animals described in 2008
Taxa named by Paulo Fontoura
Taxa named by Giovanni Pilato
Taxa named by Oscar Lisi